The Tzeo River is a river in the Central Coast region of British Columbia, Canada, flowing generally south out of the Pacific Ranges into the head of Owikeno Lake.

See also
List of British Columbia rivers

References

Rivers of the Central Coast of British Columbia
Rivers of the Pacific Ranges